Several special routes of U.S. Route 15 exist. In order from south to north they are as follows.

Existing

Santee connector route

U.S. Route 15 Connector (US 15 Conn.) is a  connector route that connects US 15/US 301 at the SCHP Patrolman Harry B. Ray Memorial Intersection just southwest of Santee with SC 6 in the northeastern part of the town.

Summerton connector route

U.S. Route 15 Connector (US 15 Conn.) is a  connector route that connects US 301 with US 15 within the city limits of Summerton. It is known as Railroad Avenue and is an unsigned highway.

Sumter connector route

U.S. Route 15 Connector (US 15 Conn.) is a  connector route that connects US 15 with US 521 within the city limits of Sumter. Each of its termini is on the Sumter–South Sumter line. It is unnamed and is an unsigned highway.

Hartsville business loop

U.S. Route 15 Business (US 15 Bus.) is a  business route of US 15 in Hartsville, South Carolina. It starts at US 15 outside of Hartsville. It then intersects South Carolina Highway 151 Business (SC 151 Bus.) in the center of Hartsville and SC 102 in North Hartsville. It then ends at US 15.

Laurinburg business loop

Established between 1960 and 1962 following the original mainline US 15 route through Laurinburg.  US 15 Business, in concurrency partly with US 401 Business and US 501 Business, traverses along Main Street and Aberdeen Road.

Durham business loop

Established in 1960 as a renumbering of mainline US 15, along University Drive and Roxboro Street, through downtown Durham.  It is in concurrency with US 501 Business for majority of its route and is relatively unchanged since inception.

Keysville business loop

U.S. Route 15 Business (US 15 Business) is a business route of US 15 in Charlotte County. The highway, which runs  between junctions with US 360 and US 15 south and north of Keysville, is entirely concurrent with US 360 Business. US 15-360 Business follow Old Kings Highway from its southern end through a partial interchange with US 15 and US 360 to the town of Keysville. The business routes enter the town on King Street, along which the highways are concurrent with SR 40. In the center of Keysville, US 15 Business, US 360 Business, and SR 40 curve north then west to cross the Southern Virginia Railroad. Just west of the railroad, the business routes turn north onto Front Street. US 15-360 Business follows Four Locust Highway to rejoin their respective mainline highways at a partial cloverleaf interchange.

Farmville business loop

U.S. Route 15 Business in Farmville, Virginia is a former segment of US 15 that begins at the southern end of an overlap at a diamond interchange with US 460. The route follows South Main Street directly into Farmville until the intersection with US Business Route 460 and Virginia State Route 45, and turns west in its own concurrency with US BUS 460. The US 15-460 concurrency ends when US BUS 15 terminates just north of a trumpet interchange at the north end of the mainline US 15-460 overlap, but US BUS 460 turns south an ends directly at that trumpet interchange with US 460.

Farmville alternate loop

U.S. Route 15 Alternate in Farmville, Virginia is an alternate route of US 15 Business. The route diverges from US 15 Business at Griffin Boulevard south of downtown Farmville. It follows Griffin Boulevard north to High Street, then turns northwest along Oak Street. It rejoins US 15 Business and US 460 Business just west of downtown Farmville.

Culpeper business loop

The first leg of US Bus 15 is Orange Road, and despite the fact that Orange Road continues past US 522 to terminate as US Business Route 29, US Bus 15 joins US 522 northwest in an overlap that meets US Bus 29, where Madion Road becomes South Main Street. Along US Bus 15-Bus 29-522, Orange Road terminates between West Park Avenue and West and East Mason Streets. The intersection of Culpeper Street is where one can find Culpeper (Amtrak station) if you turn east and drive two blocks away. US 522 turns left on West Evans Street, while four blocks later, US Bus 15-29 turns east off of North Main Street onto Old James Madison Highway, which eventually becomes Brandy Road and runs parallel to the same Amtrak line that used Culpeper Station before terminating at an interchange with the US 15-29 overlap. Brandy Road becomes Virginia Secondary Route 762.

Remington business loop

U.S. Route 15/29 Business (US 15/29 Bus.) is the former two-lane route of US 15/US 29 (James Madison Highway) through the town of Remington, bypassed in 1975. It begins in Culpeper County where the bypass curves to the north, while US 15/29 Bus. heads northeast on Remington Road to a 1930 pony truss bridge over the Rappahannock River. Crossing the bridge into Fauquier County, it soon enters Remington, where it is known as James Madison Street. The principal intersection in Remington is with Main Street (State Route 651), which heads west to the bypass and east to Sumerduck.

River Road (SR 1202), which intersects US 15/29 Bus. north of the Rappahannock, is the pre-1930 alignment of US 15 (then also SR 32). The original bridge is long-gone.

Warrenton business loop

U.S. Route 15 Business in Warrenton, Virginia is also U.S. Business Route 17 and  U.S. Business Route 29, at least at the southern end. After James Madison Highway becomes Shirley Avenue, US Bus 15 leaves this concurrency at Falmouth Street, while US BUS 17-29 continues to the northwest. Two blocks after serving as the western terminus of State Route 643, Falmouth Street intersects Mockingbird Lane and curves west to become Main Street, which runs through the heart of historic Downtown Warrenton. As Main Street terminates at the corner of U.S. Business Route 211(Waterloo Street and Alexandria Pike), US Bus 15 turns north in a concurrency with US BUS 211. US BUS 15-211 follows Alexandria Pike north until they move onto Blackwell Road before encountering at U.S. 211-Bus 29(Lee Highway) where US 211 and US BUS 211 terminates, Blackwell Road becomes State Route 672, and US BUS 15 turns east on BUS 29 before finally terminating at an interchange with the northern end of the US 15-17-29 overlap.

Leesburg business loop

US 15 enters the town of Leesburg from the south as South King Street, and U.S. Route 15 Business (US 15 Bus.) separates from it at SR 7, the Leesburg Bypass.  It continues straight into the historic downtown area, crossing the Washington & Old Dominion Railroad Trail, the Town Branch creek, Royal Street, and Loudoun Street.  US 15 Bus. crosses Market Street, State Route 7 Business, at the center of town, from which the town's four intercardinal sections radiate, and where the Loudoun County courthouse occupies the northeast corner.  US 15 Bus. then changes names to North King Street, and proceeds through the last few blocks of the historic district, crossing Cornwall Street and North Street.  It continues past Union Cemetery, Ida Lee Park, and several schools.  US 15 Bus. rejoins US 15 at the north end of Leesburg, just short of the Morven Park equestrian facilities.

Emmitsburg business loop

U.S. Route 15 Business (US 15 Business) is a business route of US 15 through Emmitsburg. Known as Seton Avenue, the highway runs  between junctions with US 15 on the south and north sides of the town. US 15 Business follows the original alignment of US 15 through Emmitsburg. The highway serves the St. Joseph's College and Mother Seton Shrine campuses, which are home to several emergency management institutions and a shrine dedicated to Elizabeth Ann Seton, the first person born in the United States to be canonized by the Roman Catholic Church. The U.S. Highway's bypass of the town was constructed between 1963 and 1965. US 15 Business was assigned to the old alignment of US 15 from south of Emmitsburg to the Pennsylvania state line by 1967. The business route became unsigned by 1989 and was truncated at its present northern end by 1999.

US 15 Business begins at a superstreet intersection with US 15 (Catoctin Mountain Highway) opposite county-maintained Old Frederick Road.  Access to northbound US 15 requires following southbound US 15 to a median U-turn. The superstreet intersection replaced a standard highway junction in 2004.  US 15 Business heads north as a two-lane road that immediately intersects the old alignment of US 15, Old Emmitsburg Road, and crosses Toms Creek.  The business route passes the campuses of St. Joseph's College and the Mother Seton Shrine.  St. Joseph's College is a defunct liberal arts college for women whose operations were absorbed by Mount St. Mary's University.  The campus is now the National Emergency Training Center, a Federal Emergency Management Agency facility that is home of the National Fire Academy, United States Fire Administration, Emergency Management Institute, and the National Fallen Firefighters Memorial.  The Seton Shrine comprises the Basilica of the National Shrine of St. Elizabeth Ann Seton and St. Joseph's Provincial House of the Daughters of Charity of Saint Vincent de Paul.

US 15 Business continues north into the Emmitsburg Historic District, where the highway intersects MD 140 (Main Street) and passes St. Euphemia's School and Sisters' House.  The business route veers northeast and crosses Flat Run before approaching its northern terminus at US 15.  Traffic from northbound US 15 Business to northbound US 15 is required to follow the ramp to southbound US 15 and turn around at US 15's interchange with MD 140.  US 15 Business continues north to North Seton Avenue, a service road that parallels the southbound direction of US 15 toward the Pennsylvania state line.  That intersection is connected to a one-way southbound ramp from US 15's intersection with Welty Road. The intersection was changed to remove access from northbound US 15 Business to northbound US 15 in 2007.  East of US 15, Welty Road immediately intersects Old Gettysburg Road, the old alignment of US 15 north towards Gettysburg.

Gettysburg business loop

U.S. Route 15 Business (US 15 Business) is a surface road in Adams County, Pennsylvania that serves as a through street in the Gettysburg area. It marks the original incarnation of US 15, before a freeway bypass was created.

The southernmost portion of the business loop is lightly traveled, serving as a rolling connecting route between the more utilized portions of this highway and a similar business loop in Emmitsburg, Maryland. The road's designation officially begins at the Pennsylvania–Maryland state line in Freedom Township. South of Gettysburg National Military Park, the road is narrow and features infrequent development, while at its southern edges, a small number tourist facilities appear. Traffic picks up greatly during peak travel months through the park, which uses this highway as one of two main access ways. At the northern border of the greenspace, the route becomes Gettysburg's main street, featuring many stoplights and often cars parked on both sides of the street. North of the city center near Gettysburg College, large homes line the street. The highway then turns northeast, passing as an overly narrow route past commercial development, before traveling into sparsely populated farm county. In unincorporated Shrivers Corner, the route meets up with Pennsylvania Route 394, with which it is cosigned for its final one-half mile, as it passes into a US 15 freeway juncture.

Major intersections

Mansfield business loop

U.S. Route 15 Business (US 15 Business) is a surface road in Tioga County, Pennsylvania that serves as a through street in the Mansfield, Pennsylvania area. It marks the original incarnation of US 15, before a freeway bypass was created.

The route begins in the south in an area that features a variety of commercial development, including the area's fast food and big box stores. After passing through a light industrial section, the road moves into the borough of Mansfield. The business loop serves as the area's main north–south street, while U.S. Route 6 is the key east–west street. After leaving the borough, it briefly travels along the forested Tioga River, before meeting a freeway junction.

Major intersections

Former

Walterboro–Creedmoor alternate route

Established in 1936 as a renumbering of U.S. Route 401, from the South Carolina state line to Creedmoor, going through the cities of Laurinburg, Raeford, Fayetteville, Lillington, and Raleigh.  In 1950, South Carolina discontinued the US 15A concurrency with US 15, but was not till 1953 when North Carolina followed and moved US 15A's southern terminus in Laurinburg.  In 1957, US 15A was renumbered back to US 401.

Sumter–Society Hill alternate route

Bennettsville business loop

Sanford alternate route

Established in 1957 when mainline US 15 was bypassed west of Sanford.  US 15A, in concurrency with US 1A and US 501A, traversed on Carthage Street and Hawkins Avenue.  In 1960, it was renumbered as US 15 Business.

Sanford business loop

Established in 1960 as a renumbering of US 15A along Carthage Street and Hawkins Avenue, in concurrency with US 1 Business and US 501 Business.  Between 1976 and 1978, US 1 Business was rerouted along NC 42 on Wicker Street; it is believed that both US 15 Business and US 501 Business were decommissioned by that time.

Chapel Hill alternate route

Established in 1953 when mainline US 15 was bypassed around Chapel Hill.  US 15A, in concurrency with US 501A, traversed on Columbia Street and Franklin Street.  In 1960, it was renumbered as US 15 Business.

Chapel Hill business loop

Established in 1960 as a renumbering of US 15A along Columbia and Franklin Streets, in concurrency with US 501 Business.  It was decommissioned between 1985 and 1987.

Future

Shamokin Dam business loop

U.S. Route 15 Business (US 15 Business) is a proposed business route of US 15 through Shamokin Dam, Pennsylvania that will be designated onto the current alignment of US 15 once US 15 is relocated to the Central Susquehanna Valley Thruway between Selinsgrove and Union Township. The southern portion of US 15 Bus. will run concurrent with US 11.

References

15
15
15
15
15
15
15
U.S. Route 15